Hellinsia excors is a moth of the family Pterophoridae. It is found in Russia (eastern Siberia).

References 

Moths described in 1930
excors
Moths of Asia
Fauna of Siberia